Jushar Haschja (born 19 September 1926) is an Indonesian fencer. He competed in the individual sabre event at the 1960 Summer Olympics.

References

External links
 

1926 births
Possibly living people
Indonesian male sabre fencers
Olympic fencers of Indonesia
Fencers at the 1960 Summer Olympics
Sportspeople from Bandung
20th-century Indonesian people